Galáctico Pegaso was a Spanish football team based in Tres Cantos, in the autonomous Community of Madrid. Founded in 1962 and dissolved in 2010, it held home games at Estadio La Foresta, with a capacity of 2,000 seats.

History
In 1962, Pegaso company, founded Club Deportivo Pegaso, with the club fluctuating between the regional leagues and Tercera División in the first 16 years of existence. In 1977, Segunda División B had been created as the new third level and, after two seasons in that category, it returned to Tercera - now division four - for a further nine years.

In the late 1980s/early 1990s, the team played three more seasons in the third division, spending the remaining years in the fourth. In the 2000, the team was moved to Tres Cantos in the Community of Madrid, merging with Club Deportivo Tres Cantos two years later, and being renamed Pegaso Tres Cantos.

In 2004, another name change, with the club being renamed Sección de Acción Deportiva Tres Cantos Pegaso. Three years later, after a merge with Tornado Tres Cantos, the latter acted as its reserve team for one year.

Subsequently, the team became the property of Stars2007 Group S.L., changing names again, now to Galáctico Pegaso. In May 2010, after losing the company's support, the club was merged with Club Deportivo Islas to form UD Tres Cantos Islas.Polémica fusión en Tres Cantos (Controversial merge in Tres Cantos) ; FutMadrid, 24 June 2010 

Club background
Club Deportivo Pegaso - (1962–2002)
Pegaso Tres Cantos - (2002–04)
Sección de Acción Deportiva Tres Cantos Pegaso - (2004–08)
Galáctico Pegaso - (2008–10)

Season to season5 seasons in Segunda División B35' seasons in Tercera División

Famous players
 Alfredo Santaelena
 Carlos Cuéllar
 Quique Flores
 José García Calvo
 Miguel Hernández
 Jaime Mata
 Juan Sabas
   Albeiro Rojas Perez

References

External links
Official website
Tres Cantos Pegaso official website

Association football clubs established in 1962
Association football clubs disestablished in 2010
Defunct football clubs in the Community of Madrid
1962 establishments in Spain
2010 disestablishments in Spain